Bathurst is an electoral district of the Legislative Assembly in the Australian state of New South Wales. It is represented by Paul Toole of The Nationals.

Bathurst is a regional electorate that encompasses the entirety of the local government areas of Bathurst Region, the City of Lithgow, Blayney Shire, Oberon Shire plus the southern part of Mid-Western Regional Council (including Rylstone, Kandos and Ilford).

History
Bathurst was created in 1859, partly replacing Western Boroughs.  Between 1920 and 1927, it absorbed parts of Hartley and Orange and elected three members under proportional representation.  In 1927 Bathurst, Hartley and Orange were recreated as single-member electorates. It was held by the Labor party for 20 years until the Coalition's landslide win in 2011, where the Nationals candidate Paul Toole recorded a swing of 36.7%, the largest in state history. Of particular note was the suburb of Eglinton, where labor support plummeted from 854 of 1,690 (50.5%) to 180 of 1,690 (10.7%) first preference votes; a precipitous decline of 79%.
This trend was somewhat reversed in 2015, with Toole being re-elected by a margin of around 15,000 votes, a majority of almost two-thirds of the vote, but still down from the approximate 20,000 margin from 2011.

Members for Bathurst

Election results

References

Electoral districts of New South Wales
Bathurst, New South Wales
1859 establishments in Australia
Constituencies established in 1859